The Indonesian Masters is a golf tournament on the Asian Tour. It was first played in 2011.

In 2017, the Indonesian Masters became the Asian Tour's flagship event, replacing the Thailand Golf Championship which had been the flagship event up to 2015. Having not been held in 2020 and 2021 due to the COVID-19 pandemic, the tournament returned to the Asian Tour schedule in 2022 as part of the International Series.

Winners

See also
Indonesia Open

References

External links
Coverage on the Asian Tour's official site

Asian Tour events
Golf tournaments in Indonesia